Adrian Taylor is a former American football defensive tackle. He played college football for the Oklahoma Sooners

References

Year of birth missing (living people)
Living people
Seattle Seahawks players
Oklahoma Sooners football players